Ralph Alton McLeod (October 19, 1916 – April 27, 2007) was a left fielder in Major League Baseball who played briefly for the Boston Bees late in the 1938 season.
 
A native of Quincy, Massachusetts, McLeod was called up to the majors by the Boston Bees in September 1938. He collected his first hit, a single, off St. Louis Cardinals pitcher Paul Dean on September 21 –the same day the Hurricane of 1938 struck New England. During the off season he worked as a salesman at a department store, but his baseball career was cut short when he was drafted into the United States Army during World War II. In a six-game career, he was a .286 hitter (2-for-7), including one double and one run scored. 
 
McLeod served as an infantryman for five years and fought in the Battle of the Bulge. After being discharged, he worked as a firefighter in his native Quincy for 32 years until his retirement in 1980. McLeod died in Weymouth, Massachusetts, at the age of 90.

References

Boston Globe

External links

1916 births
2007 deaths
Boston Bees players
Major League Baseball left fielders
North Quincy High School alumni
Baseball players from Massachusetts
American firefighters
Columbia Senators players
Hartford Bees players
Hartford Laurels players
McKeesport Tubers players
St. Paul Saints (AA) players
Toronto Maple Leafs (International League) players
American expatriate baseball players in Canada
United States Army personnel of World War II